Gaius Marius Victorinus (also known as Victorinus Afer; fl. 4th century) was a Roman grammarian, rhetorician and Neoplatonic philosopher. Victorinus was African by birth and experienced the height of his career during the reign of Constantius II. He is also known for translating two of Aristotle's books from ancient Greek into Latin: the Categories and On Interpretation (De Interpretatione). Victorinus had a religious conversion, from being a pagan to a Christian, "at an advanced old age" (c. 355).

Life 
Victorinus, at some unknown point, left Africa for Rome (hence some modern scholars have dubbed him Afer), probably for a teaching position, and had great success in his career, eventually being promoted to the lowest level of the senatorial order. That promotion probably came at the time when he received an honorific statue in the Forum of Trajan in 354. Victorinus' religious conversion to Christianity (c. 355), "at an advanced old age" according to Jerome, made a great impression on Augustine of Hippo, as recounted in Book 8 of the latter's Confessions. Marius Victorinus developed a theology of predestination and justification that anticipated St. Augustine, as well as themes that we find again in the anti-Pelagian treatises of the Bishop of Hippo. His conversion is historically important in foreshadowing the conversion of more and more of the traditionally pagan intellectual class, from the gods who in pagan belief had made Rome great.

Jerome, who was his student of rhetoric, dedicated the following words to him: I am not unaware that Gaius Marius Victorinus, who taught me rhetoric in Rome when I was a young man, has published commentaries on the apostle; but, versed as he was in knowledge of secular literature, he was completely ignorant of the Scriptures; and no one, no matter how eloquent, can correctly discuss something he knows nothing about.

Brought up a Christian, Emperor Julian had converted to a philosophical and mystical form of paganism; and once in power upon the providential death of Constantius II, Julian attempted to reorganize the highly decentralized pagan cults, on lines analogous to the Christian Church. The emperor, wanting to purge the schools of Christian teachers, published an edict in June 362 mandating that all state appointed professors receive approval from municipal councils (the emperor's accompanying brief indicated his express disapproval of Christians lecturing on the poems of Homer or Virgil with their religion being incongruous with the religion of Homer and Virgil). Victorinus resigned his position as official rhetor of the city of Rome, professor of rhetoric, not an orator. The sprightly old professor kept writing treatises on the Trinity to defend the adequacy of the Nicene Creed's definition of Christ the Son being "of the same substance" (homoousios in Greek) with the Father. After finishing this series of works (begun probably in late 357), he turned his hand to writing commentaries on the Pauline Epistles, the first in Latin. Although it seems from internal references that he wrote commentaries on Romans and the Corinthians letters as well, all that remains are works, with some lacunae, on Galatians, Ephesians, and Philippians (the comments from the first 16 verses of this latter are missing).

We are fairly well informed on his previous works, mostly texts for his teaching areas of grammar and rhetoric. His most important works from the standpoint of the history of philosophy were translations of Platonist authors (Plotinus and Porphyry at least), which are unfortunately lost. They greatly moved Augustine and set him on a road of creating a careful synthesis of Christianity and Neoplatonism that was tremendously influential. Victorinus wrote a brief treatise De Definitionibus (On Definition) that lists and discusses various types of definitions used by rhetoricians and philosophers; he  recommends the substantial definitions preferred by the latter (prior to the late 19th century this work was ascribed to Boethius). Victorinus' manual of prosody, in four books, taken almost literally from the work of Aelius Aphthonius, still exists. It is doubtful that he is the author of certain other treatises attributed to him on metrical and grammatical subjects. His commentary on Cicero's De Inventione is very diffuse.

He retained his Neoplatonic philosophy after becoming Christian, and in Liber de generatione divini Verbi, he states that God is above being, and thus it can even be said that He is not. Victorinus noted, "Since God is the cause of being, it can be said in a certain sense, that God truly is (vere ων), but this expression merely means that being is in God as an effect is in an eminent cause, which contains it though being superior to it."

For medieval authors its works were practically unknown, although it was widely exploited by Claudius of Turin at the beginning of the 9th century, by Haimo of Auxerre around 850 and by Atto of Vercelli around 920.

Works 
Mary T. Clark has identified the following works of Marius Victorinus:

Theological works 
 Candidi Arriani ad Marium Victorinum rhetorem de generatione divina (in Latin)
 Marii Victorini rhetoris urbis Romae ad Candidum Arrianum
 Candidi Arriani epistola ad Marium Victorinum rhetorem (in Latin)
 Adversus Arium (in Latin)
 I.  Liber Primus
 IA.  pars prior
 IB.  pars posterior
 II.  Liber Secundus
 III.  Liber Tertius
 IV.  Liber Quartus
 De homoousio recipiendo
 Hymnus Primus
 Hymnus Secundus
 Hymnus Tertius

Exegetical works 
 In epistolam Pauli ad Ephesios libri duo (in Latin)
 In epistolam Pauli ad Galatas libri duo (in Latin)
 In epistolam Pauli ad Philippenses liber unicus (in Latin)

Secular works 
 Ars grammatica
 Explanationes in Ciceronis Rhetorica
 In Ciceronis Topica commenta (lost)
 De syllogismis hypotheticis (lost)

See also
 Book of the 24 Philosophers
 Maria gens

Notes

References

External links
Opera Omnia by Migne Patrologia Latina

Corpus Grammaticorum Latinorum: complete texts and full bibliography

Ancient Roman rhetoricians
4th-century Romans
4th-century Christian theologians
4th-century philosophers
4th-century Latin writers
4th-century translators
Victorinus Marius Gaius
Catholic philosophers
Neoplatonists
Converts to Christianity from pagan religions
Victorinus, Gaius
Greek–Latin translators